Niveria macaeica is a species of small sea snail, a marine gastropod mollusk in the family Triviidae, the false cowries or trivias.

Distribution

Description 
The maximum recorded shell length is 12.5 mm.

Habitat 
Minimum recorded depth is 150 m. Maximum recorded depth is 150 m.

References

 Fehse D. & Grego J. (2010). Contributions to the knowledge of the Triviidae. XX. A new species from the genus Niveria Jousseaume 1884 (Mollusca: Gastropoda: Prosobranchia). Archiv für Molluskenkunde, 139(1):23-33

External links

Triviidae
Gastropods described in 2005